Rochester, Nunda and Pennsylvania Railroad was a New York railroad. Trains ran from Sonyea south through Nunda to Swain. Parts of the railroad were sold to the Pittsburg, Shawmut and Northern Railroad. Other parts of the RN&P were graded near York, NY and Fowlerville, NY and also near Chili, New York, but no tracks were ever laid.

References

External links 
 Interactive map of the Rochester, Nunda and Pennsylvania Railroad

Photos
  Paige Miller's Flickr Set, showing photos of the graded but unfinished portions of the RN&P

Defunct New York (state) railroads